Lamporecchio is a comune (municipality) in the Province of Pistoia in the Italian region Tuscany, located about  west of Florence and about  south of Pistoia,  east of Montecatini Terme, and  west of Vinci. 

Lamporecchio is the birthplace of Francesco Berni, a poet. From here started its ascent as one of the most important noble families of Tuscany, the Rospigliosi, which later moved to Pistoia and Rome, reaching the papacy with Clement IX.

The town is known for the invention of brigidini, which are thin anise flavored wafers. 

Lamporecchio borders the following municipalities: Cerreto Guidi, Larciano, Quarrata, Serravalle Pistoiese, Vinci.

A frazione of Lamporecchio, called San Baronto,   was chosen to be a part of 2013 UCI Road World Championships road race.

External links

 Official website

Cities and towns in Tuscany